Coptophyllum is a genus of flowering plants in the family Rubiaceae. The genus is found from the Nicobar Islands to western Malesia.

Species
Coptophyllum bracteatum Korth.
Coptophyllum capitatum Miq.
Coptophyllum fulvum (Zoll. & Moritzi) Bakh.f.
Coptophyllum nicobaricum (N.P.Balakr) Deb & Rout
Coptophyllum reptans (Backer ex Bremek.) Bakh.f.
Coptophyllum simalurense (Bremek.) A.P.Davis
Coptophyllum sylvestre (Ridl.) I.M.Turner
Coptophyllum vanleeuwenii (Bremek.) A.P.Davis

References

External links
Coptophyllum in the World Checklist of Rubiaceae

Rubiaceae genera
Ophiorrhizeae